Lee Jae-in (born February 6, 2004) is a South Korean actress. She first gained recognition through a blockbuster film Svaha: The Sixth Finger.

Career 
Lee Jae-in is one of the few South Korean celebrities born in Gangwon, a border province with North Korea. Lee debuted in 2012 as the child counterpart of a supporting character in tvN's daily drama Ice Adonis.

Her first prominent casting was for 2019 religious mystery film Svaha: The Sixth Finger. Her portrayal of two different twin girls has earned her various wins and nominations from major film awards. In that year Lee also played her first regular role in television series with JTBC's Beautiful World.

In 2021 Lee was cast in JTBC's legal espionage series Undercover and SBS' sport drama Racket Boys as a national youth badminton team's ace athlete. The same year she got praised for her role in the ticking clock-thriller film Hard Hit.

In January 2023, Lee signed with Yooborn Company.

Filmography

Film

Television series

Web series

Awards and nominations

References

External links 
 
 
 

2004 births
Living people
21st-century South Korean actresses
South Korean film actresses
South Korean television actresses
South Korean child actresses
People from Taebaek
Best New Actress Paeksang Arts Award (film) winners